Janardhan, known by his stage name Bank Janardhan is an Indian actor in the Kannada film industry. He is well-known for his comedy and drama roles in various Kannada films and television series. Some of the notable films of Janardhan as an actor include News (2005), Shhh! (1993) and Tharle Nan Maga (1992). He acted in kannada television serials such as Paapa Pandu.

Filmography

Television 

 Papa pandu - ETV Kannada
 Mangalya - Udaya TV
 Jokali - Udaya TV
 Robo family - ETV Kannada

See also

List of people from Karnataka
Cinema of Karnataka
List of Indian film actors
Cinema of India

References

External links
 
Bank Janardhan Filmography

Male actors in Kannada cinema
Indian male film actors
Living people
Indian male television actors
20th-century Indian male actors
21st-century Indian male actors
1948 births
Male actors in Telugu cinema